The Palace is an upcoming miniseries from HBO starring Kate Winslet, Andrea Riseborough, Matthias Schoenaerts and Hugh Grant. Will Tracy is writer, executive producer and showrunner on the series with Stephen Frears and Jessica Hobbs directing episodes and executive producing. Kate Winslet, Frank Rich and Tracey Seaward are also executive producers.

Synopsis
A year within the Palace of a crumbling authoritarian regime.

Cast
 Kate Winslet
 Matthias Schoenaerts
 Guillaume Gallienne
 Andrea Riseborough
 Martha Plimpton
 Hugh Grant

Production
The project was announced by HBO in July 2022 with Will Tracy as the show runner, with Stephen Frears directing and Kate Winslet, Frank Rich and Tracey Seaward acting as executive producers.
The writing team includes Seth Reiss, Juli Weiner, Jen Spyra, Gary Shteyngart, and Sarah DeLappe. The miniseries could mark Winslet's fourth lead role in a HBO drama series after Mildred Pierce, Mare of Easttown and potentially also the upcoming drama Trust based on the Hernan Díaz novel of the same name.

Casting
In October 2022 Matthias Schoenaerts was added to the cast. In December 2022 it was confirmed that Andrea Riseborough would be joining the cast, and that Hugh Grant would be appearing in a guest role. In January 2023 the series added Martha Plimpton to the cast and Jessica Hobbs behind the camera as co-executive producer and director. That same month Guillaume Gallienne was added to the cast as Winslet's husband.

Filming
A first look image released in February 2023 showed Winslet filming on set in Austria, with principal photography also due to take place in the United Kingdom. Principal photography in Austrian reportedly started in January 2023 at the Gartenpalais Liechtenstein (Liechtenstein Garden Palace), part of the Liechtenstein Museum, on the Fürstengasse, in the 9th district of Vienna.

References

External links

HBO original programming
British drama television series
Upcoming television series